Francis Smerecki (25 July 1949 – 7 June 2018) was a French football player and manager. He was of Polish descent.

References

External links
 
 Profile

1949 births
2018 deaths
French footballers
Footballers from Le Mans
Association football midfielders
Le Mans FC players
Stade Lavallois players
Paris FC players
Valenciennes FC players
Limoges FC players
Ligue 1 players
Ligue 2 players
French football managers
Limoges FC managers
Valenciennes FC managers
En Avant Guingamp managers
Le Havre AC managers
AS Nancy Lorraine managers
Stade Lavallois managers
Ligue 1 managers
French people of Polish descent
USL Dunkerque managers